Harry Clifford Geisinger (October 31, 1933 – May 1, 2015) was an American politician, who served two separate stints in the Georgia House of Representatives.

Born in Cincinnati, Ohio, Geisinger grew up in Chicago, Illinois, He served in the United States Navy as quartermaster during the Korean War. Geisinger then received his bachelor's degree in business from the University of Cincinnati. He lived in Roswell, Georgia and was a consultant and the owner of an advertising agency. Geisinger served in the Georgia House of Representatives from 1969 to 1975 and then from 2005 until his death while still in office. Geisinger was a Republican.

References

1933 births
2015 deaths
People from Roswell, Georgia
Politicians from Chicago
Politicians from Cincinnati
Military personnel from Cincinnati
University of Cincinnati alumni
Businesspeople from Georgia (U.S. state)
Republican Party members of the Georgia House of Representatives
21st-century American politicians
20th-century American politicians
20th-century American businesspeople